The Stanley Brothers were an American bluegrass duo of singer-songwriters and musicians, made up of brothers Carter Stanley (August 27, 1925 – December 1, 1966) and Ralph Stanley (February 25, 1927 – June 23, 2016). Ralph and Carter performed as The Stanley Brothers with their band, The Clinch Mountain Boys, from 1946 to 1966. Ralph kept the band name when he continued as a solo artist after Carter's death, from 1967 until his own death in 2016.

Early lives
Carter and Ralph Stanley were born on a small farm in Dickenson County, Virginia, near McClure.  Music was a part of their lives even in their early years, and they listened to the likes of the Monroe Brothers, J. E. Mainer's Mountaineers and the Grand Ole Opry on local radio.

Careers
The brothers formed a band, the Lazy Ramblers, and performed as a duo on WJHL radio in Johnson City, Tennessee. World War II interrupted their musical career, but once both brothers returned from the United States Army, they resumed their musical pursuits. They formed their band, the Stanley Brothers and the Clinch Mountain Boys, in the month of November 1946 as the first band to copy the Monroe sound. Carter played guitar and sang lead, while Ralph played banjo and sang with a strong, high tenor voice. Additional members of this early band were Darrell "Pee Wee" Lambert on mandolin and Bobby Sumner on fiddle. Sumner was soon to be replaced by Leslie Keith.

On December 26, 1946, the band began performing at radio station WCYB in Bristol, Tennessee as stalwarts of the famed Farm and Fun Time radio show. They made their recording debut in September 1947 for Rich-R-Tone Records which had been founded the year before. Their records sold well, "outselling even Eddy Arnold" regionally. Up to now, Ralph had been playing his banjo with two fingers on recordings and in concerts, but in 1948, he switched to the three-finger style (popularised by Earl Scruggs). In March 1949, the Stanley Brothers began recording for Columbia Records. During this time, Bill Monroe was not particularly fond of groups like the Stanley Brothers and Flatt & Scruggs who he believed "stole" his music by copying it; they were seen as "economic threats."

Financially hard times in the early 1950s forced the brothers to take a short break in their musical career. They began working for the Ford Motor Company in Detroit. Eventually, Monroe and the Stanley Brothers became friends, and Carter performed for several months with Bill Monroe in the summer of 1951. In August 1951, Ralph was involved in a serious automobile accident that almost ended his career. Following his recovery, Carter and Ralph reunited to front their Clinch Mountain Boys.

As bluegrass music grew less popular in the late 1950s, the Stanley Brothers moved to Live Oak, Florida, and headlined the weekly Suwannee River Jamboree radio show on WNER from 1958 to 1962. The three-hour show was also syndicated across the Southeast. In 1966, the brothers toured Europe, and upon returning home they continued to perform together until Carter's death in December 1966.

Many years later, Ralph revived the Clinch Mountain Boys. He performed with them through 2013. He recorded one last album in 2014, Side By Side, with his son, Ralph II. Among the musicians who have played in the revived Clinch Mountain Boys were Ricky Skaggs, Keith Whitley, Larry Sparks, Curly Ray Cline, Jack Cooke, Roy Lee Centers, Charlie Sizemore, Ray Goins, and Ralph Stanley II. Ralph's career received a big boost with his prominent role on the very successful soundtrack recording of the 2000 feature film, O Brother, Where Art Thou?, which featured the song "Man of Constant Sorrow" among others.

Legacy
The Stanley Brothers were inducted into the International Bluegrass Music Hall of Honor in 1992. In 2005, The Barter State Theatre of Virginia premiered an original stage production, Man of Constant Sorrow: The Story of the Stanley Brothers, written by Dr. Douglas Pote.

The University Press of Mississippi published the first full-length biography of the Stanley Brothers, Lonesome Melodies: The Lives and Music of the Stanley Brothers by David W. Johnson, on February 1, 2013. The paperback edition was published March 1, 2014.

Selected recordings
Among the Stanley Brothers' best known recordings are:

I'm a Man of Constant Sorrow (Columbia 20816, Rec: Nov. 3, 1950, Released: May, 1951)
Rank Stranger
Angel Band (1955)
How Mountain Girls Can Love
How Far to Little Rock? (novelty)
Still Trying to Get to Little Rock (novelty)
Ridin' That Midnite Train
Clinch Mountain Backstep
She's More to Be Pitied
The Memory of Your Smile
Love Me Darlin' Just Tonight

Clinch Mountain Boys members
Carter Stanley (lead vocalist, guitar)
Ralph Stanley (banjo)
George Shuffler (guitar, bass)
Darrell "Pee Wee" Lambert (mandolin)
Jim Williams (mandolin)
Curly Lambert (mandolin, guitar)
James Price (fiddle)
Robert "Bobby" Sumner (fiddle)
Lester Woodie (fiddle) (died 2018)
Ralph Mayo (fiddle, guitar)
Chubby Anthony (fiddle)
Art Stamper (fiddle)
Joe Meadows (fiddle)
Paul Moon Mullins (fiddle)
Red Stanley (fiddle)
Don Miller (fiddle)
Vernon Derrick (fiddle, guitar)
Curly Ray Cline (fiddle) 
James "Jay" Hughes (bass)
Ernie Newton (bass)
James "Chick" Stripling (bass)
Mike Seeger (bass)
Charlie Cline (guitar)
Bill Napier (guitar, mandolin)
Albert Elliott [ Mandolin, Upright Bass, and Baritone ]better known as [Touser Murphy] stage name.
Larry Sparks (guitar)
James Alan Shelton (guitar)
Jack Cooke (bass) 
John Shuffler (bass) 
Melvin Goins (bass, guitar)
Johnny Bonds (bass)
Bill Slaughter (bass)

Discography

78 RPM

Albums (US)
{| class="wikitable sortable"
| align="center" style="background:#f0f0f0;"|Year
| align="center" style="background:#f0f0f0;"|Title
| align="center" style="background:#f0f0f0;"|Label
| align="center" style="background:#f0f0f0;"|Number
| align="center" style="background:#f0f0f0;"|Notes
|-
|1958||Country Pickin' and Singin'''||Mercury||MG-20349||
|-
|1959||Stanley Brothers & The Clinch Mountain Boys||King||615||
|-
|1959||Hymns and Sacred Songs||King||645||
|-
|1959||Mountain Song Favorites Featuring 5 String Banjo||Starday||SLP 106||reissued 1964 as Nashville NLP-2014
|-
|1960||Sacred Songs from the Hills||Starday||SLP-122||
|-
|1960||The Stanley Brothers Sing Everybody's Country Favorites||King||690||
|-
|1960||For the Good People: Sacred Songs||King||698||
|-
|1961||The Stanley's In Person||King||719||Stereo
|-
|1961||Stanley Brothers Live at Antioch College - 1960||Vintage||ZK 002||limited edition of 500
|-
|1961||Sing the Songs They Like Best||King||772||
|-
|1961||The Stanley Brothers||Harmony||HL-7291||recorded in 1949
|-
|1961||Old Country Church||Gusto||0084||
|-
|1962||Award Winners at the Folk Song Festival||King||791||live
|-
|1962||Good Old Camp Meeting Songs||King||805||
|-
|1962||The Mountain Music Sound of the Stanley Brothers||Starday||SLP-201||
|-
|1962||Old Time Camp Meeting||King||750||
|-
|1963||Folk Concert from the Heart of America||King||834||reissued as Hollywood HT-248, Just Because|-
|1963||The Country Folk Music Spotlight||King||864||
|-
|1963||The World's Finest Five String Banjo||King||872||alternate title: Banjo in the Hills 
|-
|1963||Hard Times||Mercury||MG 20884||SR 60884 stereo
|-
|1964||Hymns of the Cross||King||918||with George Shuffler
|-
|1965||The Remarkable Stanley Brothers Play and Sing Bluegrass Songs for You||King||924||
|-
|1965||Songs of Mother and Home||Wango||LP 106||reissued 1973 as County 738
|-
|1966||The Stanley Brothers: Their Original Recordings||Melodeon||MLP 7322||1947 Rich-R-Tone sessions, recorded in Bristol, Tennessee 
|-
|1966||A Collection of Original Gospel & Sacred Songs||King||963||original title: The Greatest Country and Western Show On Earth|-
|1966||Jacob's Vision||Starday||SLP-384||
|-
|1966||The Stanley Brothers Goes to Europe||Rimrock||RLP 200||
|-
|1966||The Angels are Singing||Harmony||HL 7377||HS 11177 stereo
|-
|1966||Carter & Ralph||Starday||NLP-2037||
|-
|1966||John's Gospel Quartet||Wango||LP 103||reissued 1977 as County 753
|-
|1966||John's Country Quartet||Wango||LP 104||reissued 1973 as County 739
|-
|1966||John's Gospel Quartet||Wango||LP 105||reissued 1976 as County 754
|-
|1966||Bluegrass Gospel Favorites||Cabin Creek||203||
|-
|1967||Stanley Brothers Sing the Best-Loved Sacred Songs of Carter Stanley||King||1013||
|-
|1967||An Empty Mansion: In Memory of Carter Stanley||Rimrock||RLP 153||reissued 1978 as Old Homestead 118
|-
|1967||A Beautiful Life||Rimrock||RLP 200||reissued 1978 as Old Homestead 119
|-
|1967||Gospel Singing as Pure as the Mountain Stream||Rimrock||RLP 200||
|-
|1969||How Far to Little Rock||King||KLP-1046||
|-
|1970||Sweeter Than the Flowers||Nashville||NLP-2078||also NA7-2046-2
|-
|1970||The Legendary Stanley Brothers, Recorded Live||Rebel||SLP 1487||
|-
|1970||The Legendary Stanley Brothers, Recorded Live, Vol 2||Rebel||SLP 1495||
|-
|1971||Together for the Last Time||Lisa Joy||10329||recorded live in 1956 and 1966, reissued 1972 as Rebel SLP 1512
|-
|1972||On Radio: Great 1960 Radio Shows||Rebel||1115||recorded in Live Oak, Florida
|-
|1972||Stanley Brothers - Together for the Last Time||Rebel||SLP-1512||
|-
|1973||Stanley Brothers of Virginia||County||739||
|-
|1976||Stanley Brothers on the Air||Wango||115||
|-
|1980||Columbia Sessions Vol. 1||Rounder||SS-09||
|-
|1980||Columbia Sessions Vol. 2||Rounder||SS-10||
|-
|1984||On Radio Vol. 1||County||780||
|-
|1984||On Radio Vol. 2||County||781||
|-
|1984||Starday Sessions||County||106/107||
|-
|1988||The Stanley Brothers on WCYB Bristol Farm & Fun Time||Rebel||855||recorded 1947
|-
|1994||Clinch Mountain Bluegrass||Vanguard||77018-2||live, Newport Folk Festival, 1959 and 1964
|-
|1997||Earliest Recordings||Rich-R-Tone||6004||recorded 1947-1952
|-
|2004||An Evening Long Ago||Columbia Legacy||CK-86747||recorded in Bristol, VA, March 1956
|-
|2004||The Last Show of the Stanley Brothers: Brown County Jamboree||Stanleytone|||| recorded in Bean Blossom, IN, October 16, 1966
|}

Video

Charted singles

Footnotes

References
 Johnson, David W. (2013) Lonesome Melodies: The Lives and Music of the Stanley Brothers, University Press of Mississippi
 Malone, Bill C. (1975) Judith McCulloh, Stars of Country Music, University of Illinois Press
 Rosenberg, Neil V. (2005) Bluegrass: A History, University of Illinois Press
 Wright, John (1995) Traveling the High Way Home, University of Illinois Press
 Reid, Gary B. (2015) "The Music of the Stanley Brothers, University of Illinois Press

External links
Stanley Brothers' biography
Recording of "We Are Going to Paint the Town" from a 1958 Florida radio show (made available for public use by the State Archives of Florida)
Podcast (mp3) of one of the Stanley Brothers' Suwannee River Jamboree radio show from 1958 (made available for public use by the State Archives of Florida)
Ralph Stanley Museum & Traditional Mountain Music Center, official website of the Ralph Stanley Museum
Man of Constant Sorrow at Barter Theatre
Production photos from Man of Constant Sorrow at buddywoodward.net
The Stanley Brothers - a listing of all their songs at hankwilliamslistings.com

 
Lonesome Melodies: The Lives and Music of the Stanley Brothers (2013)

American bluegrass music groups
King Records artists
Starday Records artists
Virginia culture
Mercury Records artists
Columbia Records artists
Country musicians from Virginia
Musical groups from Appalachia
People from Dickenson County, Virginia
Musical groups from Virginia